This is a list of Austrian football transfers in the summer transfer window 2016 by club. Only transfers of the Austrian Football Bundesliga, and Austrian Football First League are included.

Austrian Football Bundesliga

Note: Flags indicate national team as has been defined under FIFA eligibility rules. Players may hold more than one non-FIFA nationality.

FC Admira Wacker Mödling

In:

Out:

FK Austria Wien

In:

Out:

SV Mattersburg

In:

Out:

SK Rapid Wien

In:

Out:

FC Red Bull Salzburg

In:

Out:

SC Rheindorf Altach

In:

Out:

SV Ried

In:

Out:

SKN St. Pölten

In:

Out:

SK Sturm Graz

In:

Out:

Wolfsberger AC

In:

Out:

Austrian Football First League

SC Austria Lustenau

In:

Out:

Floridsdorfer AC

In:

Out:

SV Horn

In:

Out:

Kapfenberger SV

In:

Out:

FC Blau-Weiß Linz

In:

Out:

LASK Linz

In:

Out:

FC Liefering

In:

Out:

FC Wacker Innsbruck

In:

Out:

WSG Wattens

In:

Out:

SC Wiener Neustadt

In:

Out:

See also

 2016–17 Austrian Football Bundesliga
 2016–17 Austrian Football First League

References

External links
 Official site of the ÖFB
 Official site of the Bundesliga

Football transfers summer 2016
Transfers
2016